Kamalapur Railway Station (officially Dhaka Railway Station) is the central railway station in Dhaka, capital of Bangladesh. It is the largest station and the busiest infrastructure for transportation in the country that acts as a gateway of the country's capital. It is also considered to be one of the most modern buildings in the decade of its establishment. It was opened on 1 May 1968.

It was built during the Pakistan period but its railway line was built during the British Indian period. After the creation of Pakistan, another railway station was constructed at Kamalapur as the old railway station in Dhaka was inadequate and a part of the existing railway line was moved from the previous position. Built in 1968, this railway station was witness to the massacre that took place during the liberation war in 1971.

After the liberation of Bangladesh, the country's first inland container depot was established here. After that several proposals and decisions were made to relocate and demolish the station building but due to objections from the authorities and dignitaries it was not done. A multimodal transport hub around the station is currently under construction which is expected to be completed by 2030.

This station is plagued with various issues. Among them are homeless people, height of platforms, insecurity, criminal activities, reluctance of passengers to use foot overbridges, problem of railway porters and unavailability of information. This central railway station of the country has 8 platforms. Apart from this, there are various facilities including hospital, mosque and police station.

History

Predecessor

In 1885, when Bangladesh was under the British Raj, Dacca State railway built Narayanganj–Bahadurabad Ghat line and opened its part for train service from the old city of Dacca (now Dhaka) to Narayanganj. In 1895, Dacca railway station (also known as Fulbaria railway station) was built with other facilities. It was established on the south side of the then main city of Dhaka. In the same year, railway connections from Dhaka to Narayanganj and Dhaka to Mymensingh were established. After the partition of India and the creation of Pakistan in 1947, Dhaka became the main city and capital of East Bengal (later East Pakistan). In that time, the railway line used to go straight from Tejgaon railway station to Fulbaria.

Establishment

Dhaka's urban status grew in the early 20th century, and so did its economy, especially after 1947. The existing railway lines extended northwards bisecting Dhaka into old and new cities, and these railway lines intersected with roads at various points, blocking the flow of north-south road traffic. Also the old Dacca railway station on the northern side of the city was incomplete, consisting of a platform, a small yard and a locomotive shed. Relocating the station to a less congested area is expected to facilitate unhindered north-south vehicular flow, and also bring old and new Dhaka cities together. In 1948, experts suggested shifting the station to Kamalapur. After 10 years in 1958, the provincial government entrusted the implementation of the scheme. Before the construction of the station, there was a paddy field at the construction site. From Tejgaon the railway line was diverted to Khilgaon, and then to Kamalapur. The station was inaugurated by Pakistani president Ayub Khan on 27 April 1968. A year after that, the headquarter of railway mail service of the province was moved here.

Post-independence

On 11 April 1987, after sixteen years of the independence of Bangladesh, the first inland container depot in Bangladesh was opened in the railway station. In the 2010s, the government proposed to shift the railway station to Gazipur District. But the ministry of Railways opposed the proposal considering the inconvenience of the city dwellers.

Multimodal transport hub
In 2018, a public-private joint investment (PPP) project with Kajima was approved to create a multimodal hub around Dhaka Airport and Tejgaon railway station along with Kamalapur Railway Station. Under this infrastructure will be built around Kamalapur Railway Station; There will be multi-storied residential buildings, hotels, shopping malls, subways and runways. In 2019, the Bangladesh Railway authority objected to the construction of a multimodal hub in front of the station building. In 2020, Bangladesh Railway and Dhaka Mass Transit Company Limited have decided to connect Kamalapur railway station with MRT Line 6 of Dhaka Metro Rail. But as the current station could not match the proposed route of MRT Line 6, it was decided to demolish the Kamalapur station and construct a new one 130 meters north. Various architects and individuals of the country opposed this decision. On 30 January 2021, the Prime Minister's Office gave permission to demolish the railway station, but in February, the Railway Ministry withdrew its decision to demolish Kamalapur. However, related authority said that the railway station may be shifted in the near future if required. Instead of demolishing the station, the government plans to construct a station complex for metrorail, subway, elevated express and bus rapid transit under the railway station area as part of the multimodal hub that is scheduled to be completed by 2030.

COVID-19 pandemic

During the COVID-19 pandemic in 2020, train services at Kamalapur railway station were suspended and access to the station was closed. Although the Kamalapur railway station was opened in June, the authority did not arrange additional trains for passengers on the occasion of Eid al-Adha. After the end of the lockdown in 2021, the government mandated online-only ticket sales, leaving the lower classes deprived of using the station. On the other hand, they could not travel sitting on the roof of the train as they were not allowed to enter the station without a ticket. After the second phase of lockdown, Kamalapur railway station was opened and rail communication resumed. In early 2022, new restrictions were imposed on the railway station as a result of the SARS-CoV-2 Omicron variant, and ticket sales were halved. It faced disaster due to the overcrowding of passengers due to the ban on the use of motorcycles in the highways and outside of district by the government around Eid-ul-Azha of the same year. As a result, its trains schedule was disrupted.

Architecture 

The architects of Kamalapur railway station were two Americans: Daniel Dunham and Bob Buie. Both came to East Pakistan as architects with Louis Berger Group. The design process started under the direction of Dunham, followed by Robert Boughey.

Dunham & Buie's design included the creation of a wide-span structure that would be suitable for the climate of the region, a challenge to them. For that they designed a concrete structure of the station building roof that was unusual, the structure had a parasol roof. The roof shelters a row of downward-facing interconnected structures. The terminal's profile – a rhythmic arrangement of gently tapered and arched shells evokes the typical image of a tropical climate, with an umbrella providing protection from monsoon rains. The design of the station includes various functional spaces including the station's ticket booth, administrative offices, passenger rest areas and waiting areas under an integrated canopy roof.

The entire structure consists of 36 squares. It has a total of 49 columns. Above it stands a roof with 36 slender concrete domes. Each column, 59 feet high, extends four branches upward and supports the roof. The station is spread over an area of 156 acres. It has 11 ticket counters and several passenger rest areas.

A monument called "Suryaketan" was constructed at the entrance of the railway station in 1999 in memory of all the railway officers and employees who were martyred in the 1971 liberation war.

Accidents and incidents
In 1971, Pakistan Army attacked the Kamalapur railway station soon after Operation Searchlight began. They killed the people in the trains reaching the station and burnt the trains. Also everyone in the station building was killed by Pakistani army. About 30 employees working at the railway station died in this massacre.

On 29 December 2014, Kamalapur railway station was involved in an accident when a train collided with a lorry, resulting in the death of 6 people. On 12 August 2017, around Eid-ul-Azha, 18 persons accused of various crimes were arrested from the railway station during the operation of the railway police station. In January 2019, a fire broke out in the station's control room, disrupting train schedules. In May 23 of the same year, a fire broke out in the station master's room, but it was extinguished with the use of fire extinguishers. On 19 August 2019, a girl was raped and killed in an abandoned compartment of the station. On 23 December 2021, a person was crushed under a train and died due to an accident on the second platform of the terminal.

On 9 January 2022, a points man of the railway station was cut and killed by an approaching train while connecting train carriages. On 23 April of the same year, During a press conference organized by Kamalapur railway station, the belongings of the station master were stolen. Later during the investigation on 18 May, the detective police recovered the stolen items along with the thieves. On 7 May, a cargo container caught fire at the station, which was brought under control by three units of the fire service.

On 7 October, a girl, who was seventeen, was raped in a train on the first platform of the station. The incident involved 6 people who worked as cleaners at the railway terminal. On 20 October 2022, Rapid Action Battalion arrested a gang of ticket black marketers of Kamalapur railway station, who since 2015 used to buy station tickets from others and sell them at high prices, creating a shortage of tickets. On 29 December, 2022, during the anti-government protest in the country, a railway security guard was killed by the explosion of a crude bomb on its platform.

Station facilities

There are eight 918.4 meter long platforms at this station, numbered 1-8 from the North West to the South East (left to right when viewed from the passenger entrance):
 Platform 1-7 are generally used for commuters, inter-city rail and long distance services.
 Suburban platform is generally used for suburban services on the Narayanganj–Bahadurabad Ghat line towards Narayanganj.

Kamalapur railway station has a yard of Dhaka Inland Container Depot owned by the authority of the Port of Chittagong. Saif Power Tech Limited was appointed as its operator in 2015. It was built on 32 acres of land near the terminal. It can hold 10 percent of Chittagong Port's 70 percent containers, i.e. 90,000 TEUS.

Railway General Hospital, Kamalapur was constructed in 1986 on 4.3 acres. The hospital was started to provide medical services to the officers and employees of Bangladesh Railway. In 2013, the hospital was planned to be taken up in public private partnership and two years later, its services were opened to all and expanded to 100 beds. Its current number of beds is 40.

There is a mosque for passengers use the station known as "Dhaka Railway Station Central Jame Mosque". Free food is distributed during iftar every year in the month of Ramadan to those who come to pray at the mosque.

The Railway Police maintains a police station at Kamalapur, with a custody suite. At the station, various accused are arrested in this railway station. The police station was modernized and renovated in 2021. After the renovation, a library and drinking water facilities have been kept here for the prisoners and the police.

Ridership

As of 2022, at least 115,000 passengers travel by train using Kamalapur railway station. The railway station is usually crowded with people returning home by train on the occasion of the festivals of Eid al-Fitr and Eid al-Adha every year. However, there was an exception during the year of the COVID-19 pandemic.

Issues

According to the statistics of 2014, the number of homeless people in Dhaka is at least 7 thousand. Many of them live in Kamalapur railway station because of lack of means. Today it is one of the refuges of the destitute population in the city. This unguarded railway station building is the target of criminal activities of vagrants. According to the information of the detective branch, various criminals are waiting to commit misdeeds at this railway terminal and hence the station is dangerous for passengers. According to Railway Police data, 86 criminals were arrested from the terminal in 2021. This is also a safe place for drug dealers. In 2022, Newsbangla24.com reported that there is a lack of security at the terminal and a lack of police personnel can be seen after the evening. The reporter saw some people taking drugs in public and interviewed a porter who was there revealed that the policemen are removed after 12:00 am. On the other hand, the railway police authority blamed the lack of manpower for this insecurity in the station.

The height of the platforms at Kamalapur railway station is disproportionate to the height of the trains. As all trains in East Pakistan were meter gauge when the railway station was built, the platforms were designed keeping meter gauge trains in mind. As a result, passengers face problems in boarding broad gauge and demo trains from the platforms. In 2021, the station was renovated to raise some of the platforms to address the issue. Although foot overbridges are provided at each platform for movement between the platforms of the station, many passengers walk over the tracks without using them to save time and the station authority does not take any measures to prevent and discourage them.

Most of the displays and schedule boards at the station are non-functional and passengers do not get accurate train information from the police information center at the station. Passengers face the problem of missing station master to get various train related information at the station. The microphone to announce the train schedule at the terminal cannot be heard clearly, leading to confusion. As of 2021, the number of railway porters work in this railway station is 210. To work as a railway porter, permission is required from the railway station authority. A reporter from Jago News 24 reported that bribes are being paid to work as porters here. Besides, it is said that the authority does not take any measures or help to solve the problems of the porters. It is also alleged by passengers that porters charge more than the government fixed rates for carrying goods.

Legacy 

Kamalapur railway station is often featured in films and other pop culture in the country. The station has been used in numerous Bangladeshi film and television productions over the years. Many films and television programs have been filmed at the station, including: 
Swatta, Fereshte, and Istition.

The original design of Bangabandhu Hi-Tech City railway station, situated in Bangabandhu Hi-Tech City near Dhaka is designed like this station. Sylhet railway station, another railway station in the north-eastern region of the country, has the structure like the central station.

Gallery

See also
 Bangabandhu Hi-Tech City railway station
 Sylhet railway station

References

Further reading
 
 
 Daniel Dunham, Pioneer of Modern Architecture in Bangladesh by Rafique Islam   pages 83–90

External links
 
 Schedule of trains at Kamalapur railway station: Bangladesh Railway 

Motijheel Thana
Transport in Dhaka
Railway stations in Dhaka District
Railway stations opened in 1968
1968 establishments in East Pakistan
History of rail transport in Pakistan
National symbols of Bangladesh